Ice hockey at the 2007 Canada Winter Games was held at the Takhini Arena and the Canada Games Centre in Whitehorse

Men's

Women's

2007 Canada Winter Games
2007 Canada Games